Aldanotreta is an extinct genus of brachiopods dating from the Tommotian age of the Cambrian period. It is perhaps the earliest brachiopod. A living relative is Lingula found in Japan.

References

External links
 

Prehistoric brachiopod genera
Cambrian brachiopods
Brachiopods of Asia

Cambrian genus extinctions